A soap dispenser (in Europe mostly known as a soap squirter) is a device that, when manipulated or triggered appropriately, dispenses soap (usually in small, single-use quantities). It can be manually operated using a handle or can be automatic. Soap dispensers are often found in public toilets.

Design

Manual soap dispensers
The design of a manual soap dispenser is generally determined by whether the soap comes in liquid, powder, or foam form.

Liquid soap
When soap is dispensed in liquid form, it is generally in a squeeze bottle or pump. The most popular soap dispensers of this type are plastic pump bottles, many of which are disposable.

William Quick patented liquid soap on August 22, 1865. Minnetonka Corporation introduced the first modern liquid soap and cornered the market by buying up the entire supply of the plastic pumps needed for the liquid soap dispensers.

Parts of the liquid soap dispenser 
•Actuator- This is the top of the pump from which is pressed down to get the liquid out

•Closure- Closure is the bottle that is fastened to the bottle's neck. it has a smooth or ribbed surface

•Outer gasket- Made up of plastic or rubber, it is fit inside the closure and prevents leakage

•Housing- The main pump that keeps the other components in the right place and sends liquid to the actuator from the dip tube

•Dip tube- This is the visible tube that carries liquid from the bottom of the bottle up to the housing

•Interior components- There is a variety of components including a spring, ball, piston, and/or stem that help moves the liquid to the actuator

How does the liquid soap dispenser work? 
The handwash bottle acts much like an air suction device that draws liquid upwards to the user’s hands against the force of gravity. When the user presses down the actuator, the piston compresses the spring and upward air pressure pulls the ball upward, along with the liquid product into the dip tube and then reaches the housing. When the user releases the actuator, the spring returns the piston and actuator to the normal position and the ball returns to its earlier position to stop the backflow of the liquid back to the bottle. This process is called ‘priming' and is only used when the handwash is put in the bottle. 

When the user presses the bottle again, the liquid in the housing is drawn from there and is released out of the actuator. During this process, the housing is again filled up with the handwash from the bottle, and the process goes on.

Dry soap

Some soap dispensers take solid bars of soap, and grate, plane, or grind them to flakes or powder as they are dispensed.

Soap mills are common in public washrooms in Germany. Soap graters made specifically for home use also exist; they can be wall-mounted, or free-standing (like a pepper grinder) and waterproof for use in a shower. Some graters take specially-dimensioned soap bars, others will take a range of ordinary soap bar sizes.

Dispensers of pre-powdered soaps, such as borax, often take the form of a metal box with a weighted lever; when the lever is pressed, a handful of soap is released. Ground soap is also used to wash laundry.

Foam soap
Foam soap dispensers have dual foam pumps that when used, move both air and soap, injecting both together through small openings to create a lather. They can be found in both manual and automatic varieties. 

Manual dispensers of foam soap often consist of a large button that squeezes the foam out of a tube. Many liquid soap dispensers operate in this way as well. A few dispensers operate with a lever that pulls forward and squeezes the soap out.

The majority of manual foam soap dispensers have the soap in a bladder in the dispenser in liquid form, as the pump is pressed the liquid soap is pushed through a small foaming nozzle which foams the soap.

Automatic soap dispensers

An automatic soap dispenser is specifically a hands-free dispenser of soap (both liquid soap and foaming soap), but generally can be used for other liquids such as hand sanitizers, shampoos, or hand lotions. Automatic dispensers are often battery-powered-powered. Hands-free dispensers for water and soap/hand sanitizer have particular virtues for operating theatres and treatment rooms.

Mechanism 

The touch-free design dispenses the liquid when a sensor detects motion under the nozzle. The electronic components of an automatic soap dispenser allow for a timing device or signal (sound, lights, etc.) which can indicate to the user whether they have washed their hands for the correct amount of time or not.

See also
 Foam pump
 Hand washing
 Soapdish

References

Kitchenware
Bathroom equipment
Toilets
Soaps
Dispensers